The Synod of Caerleon may refer to either of:

 the Synod of Victory over Pelagianism presided over by St. David in Caerleon
 the Synod of Chester